Prince of Wales's Regiment is a title that has been carried by many regiments of the British, Indian, Australian and Canadian armies and may refer to:

British Army

Infantry regiments
 West Yorkshire Regiment (Prince of Wales's Own) formed 1685, disbanded 1958
 75th Regiment of Foot (Prince of Wales's Regiment) formed 1778, disbanded 1783
 82nd Regiment of Foot (Prince of Wales's Volunteers) formed 1793, disbanded 1881
 87th (The Prince of Wales's Irish) Regiment of Foot formed 1793, disbanded 1881
 Prince of Wales's Own Civil Service Rifles formed 1798, disbanded 1921
 98th (Prince of Wales's) Regiment of Foot formed 1824, disbanded 1881
 100th (Prince of Wales's Royal Canadian) Regiment of Foot formed 1858, disbanded 1881
 Prince of Wales's Volunteers (South Lancashire Regiment) formed 1881, disbanded 1958
 Prince of Wales's (North Staffordshire Regiment) formed 1881, disbanded 1959
 Prince of Wales's Leinster Regiment formed 1881, disbanded 1922
 Prince of Wales's Own Regiment of Yorkshire formed 1958, disbanded 2006
 The Lancashire Regiment (Prince of Wales's Volunteers) formed 1958, disbanded 1970
 The Staffordshire Regiment (The Prince of Wales's) formed 1959, disbanded 2007

Cavalry regiments
 3rd Dragoon Guards (Prince of Wales's) formed 1685, disbanded 1922
 10th (The Prince of Wales's Own) Regiment of (Light) Dragoons (Hussars) formed 1715, disbanded 1969
 12th (Prince of Wales's Royal) Lancers formed 1715, disbanded 1960
 3rd Carabiniers (Prince of Wales's Dragoon Guards) formed 1922, disbanded 1971
 9th/12th Royal Lancers (Prince of Wales's) formed 1960
 Royal Hussars (Prince of Wales's Own) formed 1969, disbanded 1992

British Indian Army

Infantry regiments
 2nd (Prince of Wales's Own) Regiment of Bombay Infantry (Grenadiers) formed 1759, disbanded 1922
 1st Prince of Wales's Own Gurkha Rifles formed 1815
 2nd Prince of Wales Own Gurkha Rifles formed 1815, disbanded 1994
 14th Prince of Wales's Own Ferozepore Sikhs formed 1846, disbanded 1922
 4th Prince of Wales's Own Gurkha Rifles formed 1857
 37th (Prince of Wales's Own) Dogras formed 1887, disbanded 1922
 51st The Prince of Wales' Own Sikhs (Frontier Force) formed 1846, merged with 12th Frontier Force Regiment in 1922

Cavalry regiments
 11th Prince of Wales's Own Lancers formed 1857, disbanded 1922
 14th Prince of Wales's Own Scinde Horse formed 1922, disbanded 1947

Australian Army

Cavalry regiments
 4th/19th Prince of Wales's Light Horse formed 1948

Canadian Army

Infantry regiments
 1st Regiment, Prince of Wales' Fusiliers formed 1859, reorganised and redesignated in 1911 as The Canadian Grenadier Guards
 The Prince of Wales Rangers (Peterborough Regiment) formed 1936, converted to artillery in 1946 - now the 50th Field Artillery Regiment (The Prince of Wales Rangers), RCA

Cavalry regiments
 3rd Prince of Wales' Canadian Dragoons formed 1875, amalgamated in 1936 with The Peterborough Rangers to form The Prince of Wales Rangers (Peterborough Regiment)

British North America
 Prince of Wales' American Regiment formed in 1776/77, disbanded 1783